The mayor of Greytown officiated over the Greytown Borough of New Zealand, which was administered by the Tawa Borough Council. The office existed from 1877 until 1989, when Greytown Borough was amalgamated into the South Wairarapa District Council as part of the 1989 local government reforms. There were 17 holders of the office. John Garrity was the last mayor of Greytown Borough served from 1983 to 1989 and would become South Wairarapa's first mayor.

List of mayors

References 

Greytown
Greytown, New Zealand
Greytown
Greytown